Bertha Kalifon Madras is a professor of psychobiology in the Department of Psychiatry and the chair of the Division of Neurochemistry at Harvard Medical School, Harvard University; she served as associate director for public education in the division on Addictions at Harvard Medical School. Madras has published research in the areas of drug addiction (particularly the effects of cocaine), ADHD, and Parkinson's disease.

Madras earned a BSc in biochemistry with honours from McGill University in 1963. As a J.B. Collop Fellow of the Faculty of Medicine, she was awarded a PhD in biochemistry (metabolism and pharmacology, including hallucinogens) from McGill University in 1967. She completed postdoctoral fellowships in biochemistry at Tufts University/Cornell University Medical College (1966–1967) as well as at the Massachusetts Institute of Technology (1967–1969). Thereafter, she was appointed a research associate at the Massachusetts Institute of Technology (1972–1974) as well as an assistant professor in the Departments of Pharmacology and Psychiatry at the University of Toronto. Dr Madras joined the Harvard Medical School as an assistant professor in 1986 and was subsequently promoted to associate professor and (full) professor – with a cross-appointment to the Department of Psychiatry at the Massachusetts General Hospital. Dr. Madras also founded and chaired the Division of Neurochemistry at Harvard Medical School's New England Primate Research Centre – a multidisciplinary, translational research program which spans chemical design, molecular and cellular biology, behavioural biology, and brain imaging approaches.  She directs the Laboratory of Addiction Neurobiology, McLean Hospital, in conjunction with the Harvard Brain Science initiative.

She is married to Peter Madras and has two daughters, two sons-in-law, and five grandchildren..

Public policy work
Madras served as the deputy director for demand reduction for the White House Office of National Drug Control Policy; She was nominated by President George W. Bush in July, 2005, and unanimously confirmed by the United States Senate in 2006. In the federal budget for Medicaid reimbursement, assurances that the majority of federal employees' healthcare insurers would reimburse for these procedures, that certain State Medicaid plans would reimburse for SBI services, that the Veterans' Administration would mandate SBI for alcohol throughout the VA system, and that the Federal Health Resource Services Administration (HRSA) would implement these services in underserved populations.

Research
Madras has authored over 130 scientific manuscripts and book chapters, and she recently co-edited a book on the Cell Biology of Addiction. Along with her collaborators, she is the recipient of 19 patents.

Honours 
Her co-discovery of altropane was recognized by the Association of University Technology Managers in 2006.

References

External links

PubMed search for articles by Bertha Madras

Year of birth missing (living people)
Living people
Office of National Drug Control Policy officials
McGill University alumni
Harvard Medical School faculty
Women medical researchers
Academic staff of the University of Toronto
Women biochemists